Competitor for  Canada
 

George James Cattanach (July 25, 1878 – January 29, 1954) was a Canadian lacrosse player who competed in the 1904 Summer Olympics. Cattanach was born in Alexandria, Ontario. In 1904 he was member of the Shamrock Lacrosse Team which won the gold medal in the lacrosse tournament. He died in East Chicago, Indiana.

References

External links
 profile

1878 births
1954 deaths
Canadian lacrosse players
Lacrosse players at the 1904 Summer Olympics
Olympic gold medalists for Canada
Olympic lacrosse players of Canada
Medalists at the 1904 Summer Olympics
Olympic medalists in lacrosse